Piseco Lake is located in Hamilton County, New York, near the hamlet of Piseco in the Adirondack Mountains. The outflow is Piseco Outlet, which flows into the West Branch Sacandaga River.
In the early 1800s Joshua Brown, who was a surveyor in the area, named the lake after a Native American named "Pezeeko" who lived on the lake.

References 

Lakes of Hamilton County, New York